"Physical" was released in late 2004 by the Swedish band Alcazar as part of the promotion of the Dancefloor Deluxe compilation. The song was based on a sample of Londonbeat's 1990 hit "I've Been Thinking About You".

The song failed to chart Official Singles Chart in Sweden, but managed a # 3 placing in Finland.

Music video
The video was filmed in and around London's Soho area when the band were in the UK performing at G-A-Y Astoria.

Formats and track listings
These are the formats and track listings of promotional single releases of "Physical".

Promo
 Physical 3:30

CD Single
 Physical 3:30
 Not A Sinner Nor A Saint (Mikki Remix) 3:35

Maxi Single
"Original Version" – 3:30
"Soundfactory Club Anthem" – 9:11
"Extended Original" – 5:30
"Soundfactory Glamour Dub" – 10:12
"Mark Jason's Dancefloor Conqueror UK Remix" – 5:38

Chart performance

References

Alcazar (band) songs
2004 singles
Songs written by Jonas von der Burg
Songs written by Niklas von der Burg
Songs written by Anoo Bhagavan
RCA Records singles
2003 songs